James Blunt (born James Hillier Blount; 22 February 1974) is an English singer, songwriter and musician. A former reconnaissance officer in the Life Guards regiment of the British Army, he served under NATO during the 1999 Kosovo War. After leaving the military, he rose to fame in 2004 with the release of his debut album Back to Bedlam, achieving worldwide fame with the singles "You're Beautiful" and "Goodbye My Lover".

Blunt's first album has sold over 11 million copies worldwide, topping the UK Albums Chart and peaking at number two in the US. "You're Beautiful" was number one in the UK, the US and a dozen other countries. Back to Bedlam was the best-selling album of the 2000s in the UK, and is one of the best-selling albums in UK chart history. Blunt has sold over 20 million records worldwide. He has received several awards, including two Brit Awards—winning Best British Male in 2006—two MTV Video Music Awards, and two Ivor Novello Awards, as well as receiving five Grammy Award nominations and an Honorary Doctorate of Music in 2016 from the University of Bristol.

Early life
Blunt was born James Hillier Blount on 22 February 1974 at Tidworth Camp military hospital in Hampshire, the first of three children born to Jane Ann Farran ( Amos) and Colonel Charles Blount. His mother started up a ski chalet company in the French Alpine resort of Méribel, while his father was a cavalry officer in the 13th/18th Royal Hussars and then a helicopter pilot, becoming Colonel of the Army Air Corps. The family has a long history of military service, dating back to the 10th-century arrival of their Danish ancestors in England.

Blunt grew up primarily in St Mary Bourne, Hampshire, but moved every two years according to his father's military postings around England (Middle Wallop, Netheravon, and York) as well as Cyprus (Nicosia) and Germany (Soest). He also spent time in Cley-next-the-Sea, where his father owned the Cley Windmill. He was educated at Elstree School in Woolhampton and then Harrow School, Middlesex, gaining A-levels in physics, chemistry, and economics. He then went up to the University of Bristol, where he read aerospace manufacturing engineering and sociology, graduating in 1996 with a BSc (Hons). In March 2022 he was the subject of 'James Blunt: From A to Z', broadcast by Burst Radio, Bristol University's radio station. Like his father, Blunt is a pilot and gained his fixed-winged private pilot licence at age 16. He also developed a keen interest in motorbikes around this time.

Military service
Having been sponsored through university on an army bursary, Blunt was committed to serve a minimum of four years in the armed forces. He trained at the Royal Military Academy, Sandhurst, in intake 963, and was commissioned into the Life Guards, a reconnaissance regiment. He rose to the rank of captain. The Life Guards, part of the Household Cavalry Regiment, were primarily based in Combermere Barracks. Blunt was trained in British Army Training Unit Suffield in Alberta, Canada, where his regiment was posted for six months in 1998 to act as the opposing army in combat training exercises.

In 1999, Blunt volunteered to join a Blues and Royals squadron deploying with NATO to Kosovo. Initially assigned to carry out reconnaissance of the North Macedonia–Yugoslavia border, Blunt's troop worked ahead of the front lines, locating and targeting Serbian forces for the NATO bombing campaign. On 12 June 1999, the troop led the 30,000-strong NATO peacekeeping force from the North Macedonia border towards Pristina International Airport. However, a Russian military contingent had moved in and taken control of the airport before his unit's arrival. American NATO commander Wesley Clark ordered that the unit forcibly take the airport from the Russians. General Mike Jackson, the British commander, refused the order, telling Clark that they were "not going to start World War Three for you". Blunt has said that he would have refused to obey such an order if General Jackson had not blocked it.

During Blunt's Kosovo assignment, he had brought along his guitar strapped to the outside of his tank and would sometimes perform for locals and troops. It was while on duty there that he wrote the song "No Bravery". Blunt extended his military service in November 2000, and was posted to the Household Cavalry Mounted Regiment in London, as a member of the Queen's Guard. During this posting, he was featured on the television programme Girls on Top, a series highlighting unusual career choices. He stood guard at the coffin of HM The Queen Mother during her lying in state and was part of the funeral procession on 9 April 2002.

A keen skier, Blunt captained the Household Cavalry alpine ski team in Verbier, Switzerland, becoming the Royal Armoured Corps giant slalom champion in 2000. He left the army on 1 October 2002 having served six years.

Music career

Early career
Blunt had piano and violin lessons as a child, but was introduced to the electric guitar aged 14 at Harrow by a fellow student. His dissertation at Bristol University was entitled The Commodification of Image – Production of a Pop Idol. One of his sources was Simon Frith, a sociologist and rock critic, and chair of the Mercury Music Prize panel of judges since 1992, who later undertook a lecture tour entitled "The unpopular and unpleasant thoughts inspired by the work of James Blunt". 

While still in the army, Blunt would write songs during his time off. A backing vocalist and songwriting collaborator suggested he contact Elton John's manager, Todd Interland, with whom she used to share a house. Interland told HitQuarters that he listened to Blunt's demo while driving home and, after hearing the track "Goodbye My Lover", pulled over and called the mobile number written on the CD to set up a meeting.

Blunt left the British Army in 2002 so that he could pursue his musical career. He started using the stage name "James Blunt" in part to make it easier for others to spell; "Blount" is pronounced the same way, and remains his legal last name. Shortly after leaving the army he was signed to EMI music publishers and to Twenty-First Artists management. A record contract remained elusive, with label executives pointing to his posh speaking voice as a barrier in class-divided Britain. Linda Perry, who was just launching her own label Custard Records in early 2003, heard Blunt's promotional tape when visiting London, and soon after heard him perform live at the South by Southwest Music Festival. She made an offer to him the same night, and within a few days he signed a recording contract with her. A month later, he travelled to Los Angeles to meet producer Tom Rothrock.

2003–2006: Back to Bedlam

Blunt recorded Back to Bedlam in 2003 with Rothrock as producer in Conway Recording Studios and Rothrock's home studio in Los Angeles, playing many instruments himself. During recording, he lodged with actress Carrie Fisher. Fisher contributed in naming the album, and he recorded the song "Goodbye My Lover" in her bathroom. Back to Bedlam was released in the UK in October 2004.

Blunt's debut single in the UK was "High" (co-written with Ricky Ross of Deacon Blue). This song initially peaked below the Top 100 of the UK Singles Chart, however after the subsequent success of "You're Beautiful" it made the Top 75 before being re-released. The song was chosen to appear in a Vodafone commercial in Italy, and was a Top 10 hit in that country.

The debut album from the unknown Blunt initially attracted little critical attention; there were no published reviews from major UK music journals. His live performances, mainly in support of better-known musicians, received generally favourable reviews. His lack of performing experience and inconsistent approach with audiences was commented upon, while his music was likened to that of Damien Rice and David Gray. 

In March 2004, with Blunt performing in the support role for Katie Melua in Manchester, Alex McCann of Designer Magazine wrote, "Blunt's ascendance is a dead cert and this time next year it isn't that far removed from reality to suggest that a number one album, Brit Award and countless accolade's [sic] will be his for the taking." After the release of the album, concert support slots for Elton John and Lloyd Cole and the Commotions in late 2004 and early 2005 followed, as did a band residency at London club 93 Feet East. In March 2005, his second single, "Wisemen", was released.

Blunt's third single, "You're Beautiful", was his break-out hit. The song debuted at number 12 in the UK, and reached number one six weeks later. The song received huge airplay in the UK, propelling Back to Bedlam to number one on the UK Albums Chart. The extensive airplay ultimately led to Blunt and his co-writers being awarded the Ivor Novello Award for Most Performed Work. 

After the success of "You're Beautiful" in the UK, the song crossed over to mainland Europe, becoming one of the biggest hits of summer 2005 across the continent. In the US, "You're Beautiful" made its debut in the summer of 2005 on WPLJ, a prominent radio station in New York City, despite not having been released to radio. The song was released to radio stations in the autumn of 2005 and climbed into the Top 10 in three radio formats: Adult Contemporary Music, Hot Adult Top 40 Tracks, and Adult album alternative.

Blunt became the first British artist to top the American singles chart in nearly a decade when "You're Beautiful" reached number one on the Billboard Hot 100 in 2006; the last British artist to do so had been Elton John in 1997 with the song "Candle in the Wind 1997".
"Goodbye My Lover" was released as the fourth UK single from the album in December 2005, and the second US single. The songs "High" and "Wisemen" were subsequently re-released in 2006. Blunt began 2006 celebrating five Brit Award nominations, and went on to win Best British male solo artist and Best pop act categories, having already started an 11-month world tour. On 31 August 2006, he won two awards at the 2006 MTV Video Music Awards, with "You're Beautiful" winning the award for Best Male Video.

In late 2005, Blunt made appearances on The Oprah Winfrey Show and as a musical guest on Saturday Night Live. Eight of the songs on the album were featured in television shows (The O.C., Grey's Anatomy and many more), films (Undiscovered), and advertising campaigns (Hilton Hotels, Sprint telecommunications) throughout 2005 and 2006. He performed "You're Beautiful" at the 49th Grammy Awards in February 2007, dedicating the song to the late Ahmet Ertegün of Atlantic Records, but he did not win in any of the five categories for which he had received nominations (including Best New Artist, won by Carrie Underwood).

The album sold 11.2 million copies and topped the album charts in 16 territories worldwide. It sold 2.6 million in the US and was certified 2× platinum. In Britain the album sold over three million copies, was certified 10× platinum, and entered the Guinness Book of World Records for the fastest selling album in one year.

In 2005, Blunt performed 90 live shows, mainly across the UK and Europe, and supported Jason Mraz in a North American tour. The "Back to Bedlam World Tour" started off in January 2006, covering cities in Europe, the UK, Australia, New Zealand, and Japan, as well as three separate headline tours in North America, ending in November of that year. Not including promotional appearances, he performed over 140 live shows in 2006.

The videos for all of Blunt's singles from Back To Bedlam feature symbolism and dark imagery. In the first video for "High", he is buried in a desert. In the first video for "Wisemen", he is kidnapped and taken hostage. In the video for "You're Beautiful", he alludes to suicide by jumping off a cliff into the sea. In the "Goodbye My Lover" video, he is the outsider in a love triangle, imagining the couple, a man and woman (played by Matt Dallas of Kyle XY and Mischa Barton of The O.C.) together. The re-release video for "High" features Blunt running in a forest. The re-release video for "Wisemen" has him burning identification papers, and then walking through a forest while he is on fire.

Blunt appeared on an episode of Sesame Street which aired on 14 November 2007, singing about triangles to the tune of "You're Beautiful". A parody of "You're Beautiful" titled "You're Pitiful" was recorded by Weird Al Yankovic. He gave personal permission for this parody to be included on a Weird Al album, but Atlantic Records, his label, stepped in to forbid the commercial release of the song. Weird Al has since made the song available as a free MP3 download on his website. In a request by Yankovic to include the song on an upcoming compilation CD, Blunt's manager replied via email, "Thanks for your email, but both James and I will never approve this parody to be released on any label."

On 28 December 2009, BBC Radio 1 announced that Back to Bedlam was the biggest-selling album of the 2000s decade in the United Kingdom.

2007–2008: All the Lost Souls

Blunt's second studio album, All the Lost Souls, was released on 17 September 2007 in the United Kingdom and one day later in North America. It sold 65,000 units in its first week, and was certified gold in the UK after only four days. By the end of January 2008, the album had sold 600,000 copies in the UK, and 4.5 million copies internationally. Blunt completed the album's songs at his home in Ibiza in the winter of 2006–2007. He performed five of the ten album tracks during his 2005–2006 tours; lyrics, melodies, and harmonies were refined for the studio recording, on which his touring band played and Tom Rothrock worked as producer.

While Blunt's first album received little critical attention, critics from every major music publication, and newspapers around the world, weighed in on All the Lost Souls. The album was met with generally mixed to positive reviews, and maintains a 53/100 rating at Metacritic." Eric Danton, of the Milwaukee Journal Sentinel and The Hartford Courant wrote that the album is "a collection so bland, it makes hardtack seem sumptuous". However, Kerri Mason of Billboard said Blunt "shows the abandon and confidence of a long-term artist, not just a one-hit wonder" and continued "there is not a misstep throughout". Equally effusive, Liz Hoggard of The Observer wrote that "it's impossible to resist Blunt's troubadour yearning."

The first single from All the Lost Souls, "1973", was inspired by Blunt's nights out at Pacha, an Ibiza club, which opened in that year. The song became another hit, reaching number one on the Billboard European Hot 100 Singles chart. D.J. Pete Tong remixed "1973" and played the track during his set at Pacha over the summer of 2007. The second single, "Same Mistake", was released in early December 2007 but did not fare well in the UK charts, peaking at number 57. It was Number one in Brazil and a hit in many South American countries. The third single from the album was "Carry You Home", released in March 2008, peaking at number 20 in the U.K charts and bringing the album back into the Top 10, six months after its release. The fourth and final single from the original "All The Lost Souls" album was "I Really Want You".

Blunt collaborated twice during this album cycle. In late 2007, he worked with French rapper Sinik. They released "Je Réalise", which took elements of Blunt's song "I'll Take Everything", which hit the top three in France. On 14 November 2008, "Primavera in anticipo", Laura Pausini's new album, was released. The title track is a duet with Blunt. The album reached the Number one in Italy.

Throughout 2007 and 2008, Blunt went on his second world tour, including a performance in London's O2 Arena. In July and August 2008, he supported Sheryl Crow on a 25-date tour along with Toots and the Maytals. On 24 November 2008, All The Lost Souls was re-released as a deluxe edition, with new album artwork, new single "Love, Love, Love" and the documentary James Blunt: Return to Kosovo.

2010–2013: Some Kind of Trouble

Blunt's third studio album titled Some Kind of Trouble, was released on 8 November 2010. The album debuted at number four in the UK with over 100,000 copies sold in the first week. The album's first single "Stay the Night" was released on 27 October 2010. The single did much better in Europe than the UK, sitting at number two on the European Airplay Chart for five consecutive weeks, but only charting at number 37 in the UK top 40. The second single from the album, "So Far Gone" was released in the UK on 3 January 2011. The third single from the album, "If Time Is All I Have" was released in the UK on 4 April 2011. Overall critical reception has been mixed, with Allmusic saying, in a positive review, that "Some Kind of Trouble is a step in the right direction for Blunt, a move toward love songs free of pretension" whilst BBC Music felt "When all's said, Some Kind of Trouble is not a terrible record by any means, but there's little sense that Blunt has advanced, and equally little sense that it'll make any difference to his bottom line."

As of February 2011, worldwide sales stand at over one million copies.

2013–2017: Moon Landing

Blunt's fourth album, Moon Landing, was released on 18 October 2013. It featured production from Back to Bedlam producer Tom Rothrock. The lead single, "Bonfire Heart", debuted at number six before peaking at number four the following week in the UK Singles Chart. The single went to number 1 in Australia, Germany, Switzerland and Austria, and was in the top 10 in several other countries.

On 16 September 2014, Blunt confirmed on his official Instagram account that "Moon Landing" would be re-released on 3 November 2014. The new version of the album was named Moon Landing – Apollo Edition and contained 19 tracks: 11 from the original disc, plus the three bonus tracks of the deluxe version ("Telephone", "Kiss This Love Goodbye", and "Hollywood") and five new tracks ("Smoke Signals", "When I Find Love Again", "Breathe", "Trail of Broken Hearts", and "Working it Out"). The new track "When I Find Love Again" was released as a single that same day, after being played on BBC's Radio 2 for the first time. The official music video for "When I Find Love Again" was released on 14 October 2014. The new version of the album also contains a 19-track live DVD recorded during Blunt's performance in the 2014 edition of the Paléo Festival, Switzerland.

On 3 May 2015, Blunt was confirmed to be replacing Ronan Keating on the seventh season of The X Factor Australia. He was joined by American rock musician Chris Isaak and returning judges Guy Sebastian and Dannii Minogue.

2017–2019: The Afterlove and Walk Away
In early 2016, Blunt announced via his newsletter that he had started work on his fifth album. Titled The Afterlove, it was released in March 2017. In 2019, Blunt collaborated with German DJ and producer Alle Farben to release "Walk Away" in the dance music genre.

2019–present: Once Upon a Mind
Blunt's sixth album, Once Upon a Mind, was released on 25 October 2019. He released the song "Cold" as the lead single on 29 August.

His first "greatest hits" album The Stars Beneath My Feet (2004–2021) was released on 19 November 2021 and included four new songs, two of them released as singles: "Love Under Pressure" and "Unstoppable". A Greatest Hits tour followed, with UK dates in February 2022.

Personal life

Blunt primarily resides on the Spanish island of Ibiza. He also owns a chalet in the Swiss Alpine village of Verbier, where he has a ski lift named after him. In 2012, alongside motorcycle racer Carl Fogarty and rugby player Lawrence Dallaglio, he opened a restaurant at the top of the ski lift called La Vache. The same year, he was a victim of the News International phone hacking affair and filed for damages in a civil case.

On 6 September 2014, Blunt married Sofia Wellesley, the granddaughter of Valerian Wellesley, 8th Duke of Wellington. Blunt and Wellesley have two sons; the godfather of their elder son is Ed Sheeran, and the godmother was Carrie Fisher.

Blunt received the honorary degree of Doctor of Music (Hon DMus) from the University of Bristol in 2016.

Blunt is an active user of Twitter with over two million followers and a feed notable for self-deprecating humour. In 2020, Constable published a compendium of his tweets as a book called How to Be a Complete and Utter Blunt: Diary of a Reluctant Social Media Sensation.

Charity work
Blunt is a patron of Help for Heroes, a charity that raises money to provide better facilities for wounded British servicemen, and has also held benefit concerts for this charity.

He raises funds for the medical charity Médecins Sans Frontières. He first encountered the non-governmental organisation while on operations in Kosovo. Since then, he has been an active supporter by holding meet-and-greet auctions at many of his concerts, and filming the documentary Return to Kosovo, in which he visited the people and places he had encountered while there.

Blunt also supports environmental causes. He screened the trailer for An Inconvenient Truth at his concerts, and for each advance sales concert ticket purchased through his designated website, a tree is planted. On 7 July 2007, he performed at the Live Earth concert at Wembley Stadium in London. He contributed to the charity single, "Everybody Hurts" in aid of the 2010 Haiti earthquake appeal.

Discography

 Back to Bedlam (2004)
 All the Lost Souls (2007)
 Some Kind of Trouble (2010)
 Moon Landing (2013)
 The Afterlove (2017)
 Once Upon a Mind (2019)

Tours
Headlining
Back to Bedlam World Tour 
All the Lost Souls Tour 
Some Kind of Trouble Tour 
Moon Landing World Tour 
The Afterlove Tour 
Once Upon a Mind Tour 
The Stars Beneath My Feet Tour 

Opening act
2004 Tour 
The Secret Migration Promo Tour 
Peachtree Road Tour 
Fall Tour 2005 
2008 Summer Tour 
÷ Tour

James Blunt Band
Karl Brazil (drums, backing vocals): 2004–present
Ben Castle (lead guitar, backing vocals): 2005–present
John Garrison (bass, guitar, backing vocals): 2007–present
Christopher Pemberton (keyboards, backing vocals): 2014–present
Richard Cardwell (keyboards, backing vocals): 2014–present
Kristoffer Sonne (drums): 2017–present

Former members
Daisy Blount (backing vocals): 2004
Paul Freeman (lead guitar, backing vocals): 2004–2005
Malcolm Moore (bass, backing vocals): 2004–2007, 2010–2014
Paul Beard (piano, keyboards, backing vocals): 2004–2014
Simon Lea (drums): 2014–2015
Morten Hellborn (drums): 2015

Awards and nominations

Brit Awards

|-
|rowspan="5"|2006
|rowspan="3"|James Blunt
|British Pop Act
|
|-
|British Male Solo Artist
|
|-
|British Breakthrough Act
|
|-
|Back to Bedlam
|British Album of the Year
|
|-
|"You're Beautiful"
|British Single of the Year
|
|-
|2008
|"1973"
|British Single of the Year
|
|}

BT Digital Music Awards

|-
|2005
|James Blunt
|Best Pop Artist
|
|}

Grammy Awards

|-
|rowspan="5"|2007
|James Blunt
|Best New Artist
|
|-
|rowspan="3"|"You're Beautiful"
|Record of the Year
|
|-
|Song of the Year
|
|-
|Best Male Pop Vocal Performance
|
|-
|Back to Bedlam
|Best Pop Vocal Album
|
|}

MTV Australia Awards

|-
|rowspan="2"|2006
|rowspan="2"|"You're Beautiful"
|Song of the Year
|
|-
|Best Male Artist
|
|}

MTV Europe Music Awards

|-
|rowspan="3"|2005
|rowspan="2"|James Blunt
|Best New Act
|
|-
|Best UK & Ireland Act
|
|-
|"You're Beautiful"
|Best Song
|
|}

MTV Video Music Awards

|-
|rowspan="3"|2006
|rowspan="3"|"You're Beautiful"
|Best New Artist
|
|-
|Best Male Video
|
|-
|Best Cinematography
|
|}

Q Awards

|-
|rowspan="3"|2005
|James Blunt
|Best New Act
|
|-
|"You're Beautiful"
|Best Track
|
|-
|Back to Bedlam
|Best Album
|
|}

Teen Choice Awards

|-
|rowspan="4"|2006
|rowspan="2"|James Blunt
|Choice Music: Male Artist
|
|-
|Choice Music: Breakout Male Artist
|
|-
|rowspan="2"|"You're Beautiful"
|Choice Music: Single
|
|-
|Choice Music: Love Song
|
|}

2006
 NRJ Music Award (France) – Best International Newcomer
 Echo Music Prize (Germany) – Best International Newcomer
 NME Awards – Worst Album
 Ivor Novello Awards – Most Performed Work and International Hit of the Year 
 World Music Awards – Best New Artist in the World and Biggest Selling British Artist in the World
 Premios 40 Principales – Mejor Artista Revelación Internacional (Nominated)

2007
 IFPI Hong Kong Top Sales Music Awards – Top 10 Best Selling Foreign Albums All the Lost Souls

2008
 Echo Music Prize (Germany) – Best International Male Artist

2010
 Virgin Media Music Awards – The Hottes

2011
Elele Magazine Teen Idol of Turkey 2011

2014
NME Awards for Best Band Blog or Twitter (nominated)
Hungarian Music Awards – Pop/Rock Album of the Year for Moon Landing

2016
 Honorary doctorate from the University of Bristol

References

Bibliography
 Hardy, Peter (2010). Different Country, Same State. London: Headline Publishing Group. . Retrieved 25 August 2013.

See also
Blount baronets

External links

 
 

 
1974 births
Living people
People from St Mary Bourne
People from Tidworth
People educated at Elstree School
People educated at Harrow School
Graduates of the Royal Military Academy Sandhurst
Alumni of the University of Bristol
English people of Danish descent
20th-century British Army personnel
21st-century British Army personnel
20th-century English singers
21st-century English singers
Atlantic Records artists
Brit Award winners
British male pianists
British Life Guards officers
British soft rock musicians
Custard Records artists
Echo (music award) winners
English keyboardists
English male guitarists
English male singers
English male singer-songwriters
English multi-instrumentalists
English pop guitarists
English pop pianists
English pop rock singers
English pop singers
Ivor Novello Award winners
Military personnel of the Kosovo War
Musicians from Wiltshire
MTV Europe Music Award winners
Warner Music Group artists
World Music Awards winners
BT Digital Music Awards winners
English expatriates in Spain
English expatriates in Switzerland